OSSB may refer to:

Order of the Star Spangled Banner, an oath-bound secret society in New York City
Oriented structural straw board,  an engineered board
Orquesta Sinfonica Simon Bolivar, a Venezuelan symphony orchestra 
Ohio State School for the Blind
Oregon State School for the Blind, later Oregon School for the Blind